Asbury Bratten "Bugs" Morris (April 13, 1900 – May 4, 1983) was an American football and baseball player, coach of football and basketball, and college athletics administrator. He was the fifth head football coach at Abilene Christian University in Abilene, Texas, serving for 18 seasons, from 1924 until 1941, and compiling record of 61–75–18. Morris was also the head basketball coach at Abilene Christian from 1924 to 1943 and again from 1945 to 1955, tallying a mark of 304–242. Morris also coached Greenville High School in 1923 to a 4–3 mark.

Head coaching record

College football

References

External links

 

1900 births
1983 deaths
American football quarterbacks
Baseball shortstops
Basketball coaches from Texas
Baseball second basemen
Abilene Christian Wildcats athletic directors
Abilene Christian Wildcats football coaches
Abilene Christian Wildcats men's basketball coaches
Ardmore Bearcats players
Ardmore Snappers players
Henryetta Hens players
Texas A&M Aggies baseball players
Texas A&M Aggies football players
High school football coaches in Texas
People from Cedar Hill, Texas
People from DeSoto, Texas
Sportspeople from the Dallas–Fort Worth metroplex
Players of American football from Texas
Baseball players from Texas